Karanis, located in what is now Kom Oshim, was an agricultural town in the Ptolemaic Kingdom, and Roman Egypt located in the northeast corner of the Faiyum. It was roughly 60 hectares in size and its peak population is estimated to be 4000 people, although it could have been as much as three times greater. Karanis was one of a number to towns in the Arsinoite nome established in the third century BC by Ptolemy II Philadephus, and lasted until the 6th century AD. Though Karanis declined in the late Ptolmaic period, in the first century BC, the town expanded north when Augustus, having conquered Egypt and also recognizing the Faiyum's agricultural potential, sent workers to clean up the canals and restore the dikes that had fallen into decline, restoring productivity to the area.

South Temple
The south temple's origins can be traced back to as early as the first century BC and it was occupied until the late third or fourth century AD. The temple was dedicated under Nero to the crocodile related gods Pnepheros and Petesouchos. It is built in an Egyptian style, made of limestone blocks, and may have been built on the site of an earlier temple. In addition to shrine rooms and storage rooms, the north and south sides of the south temple contain houses and storerooms for the temple's priests. Local weddings and banquets could be held in the dining room in the temple's south east corner.

North Temple 
The north temple was built in the early Roman period, and is made of limestone in Egyptian style. It is mostly undecorated, with the exception of Greco-Roman style engaged columns on the temple's outer corners and in each internal doorway. Though the temple has no inscription clearly stating its purpose, it is likely decorated to a crocodile god, indicated by the presence of an altar that fits a crocodile mummy, and of a soft white limestone figure of a hawk headed crocodile that likely represents the god Soknopaios. The temple also features an altar with the head of Serapis, Zeus, or a syncretism of the two.

Conditions in the town
The Fayum towns were settled by Roman veterans after Augustus conquered Egypt, though the small number of Latin papyri found in Karanis (only two) and the overwhelming number of Greek papyri from or concerning these veterans from this period suggest that these new soldiers may not have been culturally Roman but instead Greek, or at the very least from the Eastern empire. "The peace and political stability brought by Augustus and kept alive by his successors, meant prosperity for generations of landholders at Karanis well into the second century.

In the late second century, and again in the second quarter of the third, there were notable recessions that mirrored difficulties experienced by the Empire at large, houses had fallen down by the end of the 3rd century,
and the town was completely abandoned by the early 5th century. The dry conditions that Karanis was left in are most suitable for the preservation of papyri, and it is for this that Karanis is most well known by archaeologists.

Papyri

The papyri excavated are historically significant in that they come from the same place and time, all dating from the period between the reign of Diocletian and the 370s.
Also, with Karanis being a relatively poor town, the documents and artifacts excavated "[provide] a microcosm of life as it was lived by ordinary people in Egypt under Greek and Roman rule," and provide evidence of the whole of Egypt's relationship to the Empire of Rome. The papyri contain mostly tax records, which is how archaeologists have determined that Karanis and its veterans were mostly poor, self-sufficient farmers who did not have much contact with other towns in the region.

Excavations
These excavations were extremely troubled to say the least. In the late 19th and early 20th centuries, farmers would “obtain permits to remove soil from the Karanis mound to use as fertilizer (sebbakh)”, the organic decay making the soil very rich.

The first real excavation was in 1895 by Englishmen Bernard Pyne Grenfell and Arthur Surridge Hunt,  though they felt the area had been too plundered to produce anything of much value. At this time, archaeology as a pursuit of knowledge was almost unheard of, and papyri and other artifacts were often treated as items to collect. Also during this time (i.e., the late 19th and early 20th centuries), excavators were almost solely interested in artifacts dating to the older dynasties. Graeco-Roman sites such as Karanis continued to be plundered for sebbakh until Francis W. Kelsey, a professor of Latin language and literature at the University of Michigan, observed this devastation and received grants to search for an excavation site in 1924. Starting excavations of Karanis in 1925, his goal was to "increase exact knowledge rather than the amassing of collections", with a focus on common people. The papyri collected are now part of the University of Michigan Papyrus Collection. More recent excavations have been done by the Cairo University, the French Institute, and for the last few years by a combined collaboration of UCLA and the University of Groningen (RUG) in the Netherlands.

Notes

Bibliography
Alston, Richard. Soldier and Society in Roman Egypt: Social History. London: Routledge, 1998.

Bagnall, Roger S., Naphtali Lewis, eds. Columbia Papyri VII: Fourth Century Documents from Karanis. Ann Arbor: Scholars Press, 1979.

Gazda, Elaine K., ed. Karanis: An Egyptian Town in Roman Times: Discoveries of the University of Michigan Expedition to Egypt (1924–1925). Ann Arbor: Kelsey Museum of Archaeology, 1983, reprinted in 2004 with a new preface and updated bibliography. A free digital publication from the Kelsey Museum of Archaeology.

Grenfell, Bernard P., Arthur S. Hunt, David G. Hogarth. Fayum Towns and Their Papyri. London: Office's of the Egypt exploration fund [etc.], 1990.

Youtie, Herbert Chayyim, and John Garret Winter, eds. Michigan Papyri, Vol. VIII: Papyri and Ostraca from Karanis, Second Series. Ann Arbor: The University of Michigan Press, 1951.

Archaeological sites in Egypt
Former populated places in Egypt